David or Dave Bowman may refer to:

David Bowman (Space Odyssey), a character in the Space Odyssey series
David Bowman (footballer, born 1960), English footballer
Dave Bowman (footballer, born 1964), English-born Scottish footballer
David Bowman (botanist) (1838–1868), English botanist who collected plants for James Veitch & Sons
David Bowman (politician) (1860–1916), Queensland Leader of the Opposition, 1908–1912
David Bowman (bishop) (1932–2015), bishop of the Episcopal Church of the United States
Dave Bowman (musician) (1914–1964), American jazz pianist
David Bowman, member of the Vancouver-based band soulDecision
 David Bowman Schneder (1857–1938), American missionary
 David Bowman (writer) (1957–2012), American writer